Damian Roßbach (born 27 February 1993) is a German professional footballer who plays as a defender for F.C. Hansa Rostock.

Club career
As a youth, he played for 1. FSV Mainz 05.

On 1 July 2014, he signed a one-year contract for the 2014–15 Bundesliga season, while still able to play for the reserve team in the 2014–15 3. Liga season.

External links
 
 

1993 births
Living people
Footballers from Frankfurt
Association football defenders
German footballers
1. FSV Mainz 05 players
Karlsruher SC players
SV Sandhausen players
FC Hansa Rostock players
2. Bundesliga players
3. Liga players